The Downtown Westerly U.S. Post Office is a historic post office building at 5 High Street at the intersection of Broad Street in Westerly, Washington County, Rhode Island.

Description

The building was designed in the Classical Revival style by architect James Knox Taylor and was built from 1913 to 1914.  The single-story building features a broad curving facade with eight fluted Doric columns of Vermont marble, flanked by wide piers.  The interior lobby space retains many original features, including terrazzo and marble flooring, and a coffered ceiling with decorative moulding.

The building was added to the National Register of Historic Places in 1971.

The building "demonstrates the height of grand government-sponsored design" and "is often considered the finest post office in the state," according to a 2019 Providence Journal article.

See also
National Register of Historic Places listings in Washington County, Rhode Island

References

External links

Westerly
Buildings and structures in Washington County, Rhode Island
Government buildings completed in 1913
Government buildings on the National Register of Historic Places in Rhode Island
Neoclassical architecture in Rhode Island
Westerly, Rhode Island
1913 establishments in Rhode Island
National Register of Historic Places in Washington County, Rhode Island
Historic district contributing properties in Rhode Island